Pins & Panzers is the 2009 debut album of indie band Plushgun, released on February 17, 2009.

Track listing
"Dancing in a Minefield" – 3:36
"How We Roll" – 4:05
"Just Impolite" – 3:52
"A Crush to Pass the Time" – 4:03
"The Dark in You" – 3:54
"Let Me Kiss You Now (And I'll Fade Away)" – 3:26
"Union Pool" – 4:01
"14 Candles" – 4:10
"Without a Light" – 4:31
"An Aria" – 3:54

References

2009 albums
Plushgun albums